Édson Fernandes Botelho Júnior (born 20 March 1995), known as Édson Júnior is a Brazilian footballer who plays as a forward for Atlético Goianiense.

Career
Édson Júnior came through the youth ranks with Goiás before transferring to Atlético Goianiense in time for the 2016 Campeonato Brasileiro Série B season. He played twice as a substitute, making his debut against Avaí on 8 October 2016, and scoring his first goal against Sampaio Corrêa on 19 November 2016. For the 2017 Campeonato Brasileiro Série D season he was loaned to São Bernardo. On his return to Atlético Goianiense he suffered a serious knee ligament injury which kept him on the sidelines for the 2017 Campeonato Brasileiro Série A campaign.

Atlético Goianiense made Édson Júnior available for loan for the 2019 season.

References

External links
 
 

1995 births
Living people
Sportspeople from Goiânia
Brazilian footballers
Association football forwards
Campeonato Brasileiro Série B players
Campeonato Brasileiro Série D players
Goiás Esporte Clube players
Atlético Clube Goianiense players
São Bernardo Futebol Clube players